The Bison Radio Network, known as the Peterson Farms Seed Bison Radio Network for sponsorship reasons, is a series of 22 radio stations that broadcast North Dakota State Bison Athletics to the United States and Canada: North Dakota, Minnesota, Montana, Nebraska, South Dakota, Saskatchewan, and Manitoba over the air, and around the world via online streaming.

List of stations
Fargo, ND   KPFX 107.9 The Fox FM
Fargo, ND   KQWB 1660 The Bison
Albany, MN   KDDG 105.5 
Bismarck, ND   KXMR 710 (day) 
Bismarck, ND   KFYR 550 (night) 
Bowman, ND   KPOK 1340  
Detroit Lakes, MN   KDLB 94.5 FM
Devils Lake, ND  KDVL 102.5
Dickinson, ND   KLTC 1460 
Fergus Falls, MN   KBRF 1250 AM
Fosston, MN   KKCQ-FM 96.7 
Glenwood, MN   KMGK-FM 107.1 
Grafton, ND   KAUJ-FM 101.9 
Harvey, ND   KHND 1470 
Jamestown, ND   KSJB 600
Minneapolis-St. Paul, MN   KYCR (AM) 1440 AM
Minot, ND   KHRT 1320
Oakes ND KDDR AM 1220
Park Rapids MN  KXKK FM 92.5
Roseau, MN KCAJ-FM 102.1
Rugby, ND   KZZJ 1450
Wahpeton, ND KBMW AM 1450
Williston, ND   KEYZ 660

References

External links
Paul’s AM 1570 KYCR Joins Bison Radio Network
North Dakota State announces media rights agreement
Bison Radio Network Online Streaming
Official Athletics Website
Topg88
 Bison Radio Network press release

North Dakota State University
College football on the radio
Sports radio networks in the United States